Mameigwess Lake is a lake in the south of the Unorganized Part of Kenora District in northwestern Ontario, Canada. The lake is in the Hudson Bay drainage basin.

The southwest corner of the lake is in geographic Isley Township and the southeast corner of the lake in geographic Bradshaw Township. There is a hunting and fishing camp on the lake.

There are numerous unnamed inflows. The primary outflow, at the southeast in geographic Bradshaw Township, is the Mameigwess River, which flows via the Agimak River, the English River, the Winnipeg River and the Nelson River to Hudson Bay.

References

Lakes of Kenora District